The Gokak Falls is a waterfall located on the Ghataprabha River in Belagavi district of Karnataka, India. The waterfall is six and a half kilometers away from Gokak town.

About Gokak Water Falls
It also has a hanging bridge which is an attraction for people visiting Gokak.

Nearby Cities
 Belagavi
 Sangli

Nearby Rail Stations
 Ghataprabha railway station
 Belagavi railway station
 Sangli railway station

References

External links
 Gokak Falls Official Government Website

Waterfalls of Karnataka
Geography of Belagavi district
Tourist attractions in Belagavi district